Klas Vangen (born 18 September 1978) is a Norwegian snowboarder. He competed in the men's halfpipe event at the 1998 Winter Olympics.

References

External links
 

1978 births
Living people
Norwegian male snowboarders
Olympic snowboarders of Norway
Snowboarders at the 1998 Winter Olympics
People from Molde
Sportspeople from Møre og Romsdal
20th-century Norwegian people